The 2003–04 season was Motherwell's 6th season in the Scottish Premier League, and their 19th consecutive season in the top division of Scottish football.

Squad

Transfers

In

Out

Released

Competitions

Premier League

Results summary

Results by round

Results

Table

Scottish Cup

League Cup

Squad statistics

Appearances

 

|-
|colspan="14"|Players who appeared for Motherwell but left during the season:

|}

Goal scorers

Clean sheets

Disciplinary record

See also
 List of Motherwell F.C. seasons

Note

References

2003-04
Scottish football clubs 2003–04 season